Chiayi (Taigi POJ: Ka-gī), officially known as Chiayi City, is a city of the streamlined Taiwan Province, Republic of China located in the plains of southwestern Taiwan surrounded by Chiayi County with a population of 263,188 inhabitants as of January 2023.

Hoanya people inhabited present-day Chiayi under its historical name Tirosen prior to the arrival of Han Chinese in Taiwan and was ruled by the Dutch and Kingdom of Tungning under various names. During the Qing dynasty, Tirosen was governed as part of Taiwan Prefecture in Fujian under Zhuluo County and the city was renamed to Kagee in 1787. The city was once again named Kagi during the Japanese era but the earthquake destroyed much of the town. Kagi became administered as part of Tainan Prefecture from 1920. Following the surrender of Japan, the Republic of China, who deposed the Qing in 1911, took control of the city in 1945 as Chiayi City and became administered as a provincial city of Taiwan Province before being integrated in Chiayi County in 1950 as a county-administered city and later restored its status as provincial city in 1982. In 1998, Taiwan Province became streamlined and Chiayi City became governed directly by the Executive Yuan.

The city is known for Alishan National Scenic Area and warm humid subtropical climate in the summer months. Left with the landmarks of Japanese colonial rule, Chiayi City has the round-island railway system and Alishan Forest Railway where the city is the starting point along with various Japanese temples.

Name
Like the county, Chiayi City's former Chinese placename was Tsu-lo-san, a representation of the original Formosan-language name Tirosen. A shortened version, Tsulo, was then used to name Tsulo County, which originally covered the underdeveloped northern two-thirds of the island. In 1704, the county seat was moved to Tsulosan, the site of modern-day Chiayi City. Following the 1723 Zhu Yigui rebellion, the county was reduced in size. In 1787, the county and city were renamed Chiayi by the Qianlong Emperor to acknowledge the citizens' loyalty during the Lin Shuangwen rebellion.

History

Early history
First inhabited by the Hoanya aborigines, the region was named Tirosen (variants Tirocen, Tiracen). With the arrival of Han Chinese immigrants in southwestern Taiwan, the name evolved to become Tsulosan in Hokkien. Eventually, Tsulosan was shortened to simply Tsulo. Because of the choice of the characters, it has been mistakenly suggested that the origin of the name came from the expression "mountains surrounding the east". "Peach City" is another name for Chiayi City due to its peach-shaped territory in ancient times. The tip of the peach is around Central Fountain and was called "Peach-tip" by citizens.

Tsulosan was once the foothold to which people from the mainland immigrated. In 1621, who came from Zhangzhou, Fujian Province, first led his people to cultivate this land after they landed at Ponkan (modern-day Beigang).

Dutch Formosa
Records from the Dutch era show Tirosen as the usual form of the name; it also occurred as Tirassen, Tirozen, Tilocen, Tilossen, Tilocen, and Thilocen. The place was north of Mattau (modern-day Madou, Tainan) and south of Favorlang (Huwei, Yunlin).

Kingdom of Tungning
In 1661 (the 15th year of Yung-Li, Ming dynasty), Koxinga defeated the Dutch based in Taiwan and founded the Kingdom of Tungning. Chiayi was under the jurisdiction of the Tien-Hsing County.

Qing dynasty
In 1683, when Qing rule began, the island was governed as Taiwan Prefecture under the administration of Fujian Province. In 1684, Tsulo County was established and initially encompassed the underdeveloped northern two-thirds of Taiwan. (Taiwan and Hongsoa counties were divided from Wan-Nien County during the Kingdom of Tungning, which was changed from Tien-Hsing County.) In 1704, the county seat was moved to Tsulosan, the site of modern-day Chiayi City, and had wooden city walls.

In 1727, the county magistrate, Liu Liang-Bi rebuilt the gatehouses and set a gun platform for each gatehouse. The four gatehouses were named: "Chin Shan" for East, "Tai Hai" for West, "Chung Yang" for South, and "Kung Chen" for North. In 1734 (the 12th year of Yongzheng), magistrate Lu-Hung built piercing-bamboo to better protect the city.

In 1786, the Lin Shuangwen rebellion was an attempt to siege Tsulosan but failed to overcome the defense of the inhabitants. Consequently, on November 3 of the next year, the Qing Emperor conferred the name Kagee to praise the citizens' loyalty.

In the mid-1800s, a custom of annual riotous mass stoning developed in the city.

In 1887, a separate Taiwan Province was declared and the island was administratively divided into four prefectures; the city of Kagee belonged to Tainan Prefecture.

Japanese rule

In 1895, Taiwan was ceded to Japan in the Treaty of Shimonoseki. The 1906 Meishan earthquake devastated the entire city wall except the Eastern Gate. The Japanese authorities reconstructed the city. Industries and trades started to flourish. According to the census taken in 1904, Kagi was the fourth most populous city in Taiwan, with a population of over twenty thousand.

The Great Kagi earthquake (later also known as the 1906 Meishan earthquake) struck the city in mid March 1906.

In 1907, the construction of Alishan Forest Railway to Mount Ali was begun. In 1930, the town was upgraded to an autonomous city under the same prefecture.

Republic of China

After the handover of Taiwan from Japan to the Republic of China in October 1945, Chiayi City was established as a provincial city of Taiwan Province. The city consisted of 8 districts, which were Bajiang, Beimen, Beizhen, Nanmen, Tungmen, Tungshan, Ximen and Zhuwei Districts. In 1946, the districts was reorganized to 6 districts in which Bajiang and Nanmen were merged to become Xinnan, Beimen and Beizhen were merged to become Xinbei, Tungmen and Tungshan were merged to become Xindong, Ximen and Zhuwei were merged to become Xinxi District and there were 2 addition of districts from Tainan County which were Shuishang and Taibao Districts.

Chiayi saw some of the most violent events during the 228 Incident. In early March, local militas surrounded the Shueishang Airport and fought against the KMT military. There were over 300 casualties. The Kuomintang also executed many civilians in Chiayi.

On 16 August 1950, because of the re-allocation of administrative areas in which Taiwan was divided into 16 counties, five provincial cities and a special bureau, Chiayi City was downgraded to a county-administered city and merged with Chiayi County to be the county seat. As a result, a shortage of capital hindered its development.

On 1 July 1982, Chiayi City was elevated again to a provincial city as a result of pressure from local elites. On 6 October 1990, the East District and West District were established.

Geography

Chiayi City is located on the north side of Chianan Plain, south west of Taiwan Island. On the east side is the Mount Ali, on the west side is the Chiayi Airport, on the north side is the Puzi River and on the south side is the Bazhang River. Chiayi City is completely surrounded by Chiayi County. Most of Chiayi City land are broad flat fertile plains. The terrain slowly rises from west to east. Chiayi is also one of the closest Taiwanese cities to the Tropic of Cancer, with the latitudinal line lying just south of the city.

Climate
Chiayi City has a warm humid subtropical climate (Köppen Cwa). Northeasterly winds during fall and winter mean that rainfall is depressed during that time, while southwesterly winds during summer and the later portion of spring bring most of the year's rainfall, with more than 60% falling from June to August. Humidity is high year-round, even during winter.

Government

Chiayi City is a provincial city of Taiwan Province of the Republic of China. The city is governed by the Chiayi City Government, while the residence is represented in the Chiayi City Council. The current Mayor of Chiayi City is Huang Min-hui of the Kuomintang.

Administrative divisions
Chiayi City is divided into two districts. East District is the city seat which houses the Chiayi City Government.

Politics

Chiayi City voted one Democratic Progressive Party legislator to be in the Legislative Yuan during the 2020 Taiwanese legislative election. It has historically been a very pan-Green city. During the martial law era, most people of Chiayi supported tangwai politicians. However, the voting gap between the DPP and the KMT has narrowed in recent years. And in 2022 Taiwanese local elections, Chiayi City re-elected Huang Min-hui of Kuomintang to be the mayor.

Demographics
Chiayi city is a 100% purely ethnic Hokkien inhabited city.

Education

 National Chiayi University
 National Chung Cheng University
 Tatung Institute of Commerce and Technology
 Chung Jen College of Nursing, Health Science and Management

Energy

Green energy
On 17 December 2015, Chiayi City Government launched a program to set up solar panels at schools and offices in the city to reduce green house gases. The program is expected to produce 3.55 million kWh of electricity annually and to help reducing carbon emission by 1,700 tonnes.

Tourist attractions

 Art Site of Chiayi Railway Warehouse
 Chia-Le-Fu Night Market
 Chiayi Art Museum
 Chiayi Botanical Garden
 Chiayi Cheng Huang Temple
 Chiayi City Municipal Baseball Stadium
 Chiayi Cultural and Creative Industries Park
 Chiayi Jen Wu Temple
 Chiayi Municipal Museum
 Chiayi Park
 Chiayi Confucian Temple
 Kagi Shrine
 Sun-Shooting Tower
 Chiayi Prison Museum
 Hinoki Village
 Lantan Lake
 Museum of Old Taiwan Tiles
 St. John's Cathedral
 Taiwan Hinoki Museum
 Water Source Water Meter Room
 Wenhua Road Night Market
 Historic Archives Building of Chiayi City
 228 Memorial Park
 National 228 Memorial Park
 Chung Cheng Park
 Alishan Forest Railway & Railway Park
 Chiayi International Band Festival

Chiayi is the city of wind music in Taiwan. The wind music festival started as a local event in 1988, when it was more like a joint performance by local wind music bands. Over the years the festival has become the most anticipated annual event in Chiayi.

Sports
Major sporting events held by Chiayi include:
 1999 Asian Youth Boys Volleyball Championship
 2001 Baseball World Cup (Co-hosted with Taipei, New Taipei, and Kaohsiung)
 2012 Asian Soft Tennis Championship
 2018 World University Baseball Championship

Notable residents/natives 
 Tan Ting-pho (1895–1947), Taiwan famous painter.
 Sow-Hsin Chen (1935–2021), American physicist, Professor.
 Vincent Siew (1939), Taiwanese politician, Vice President of the Republic of China (2008–2012), Vice-Chairman of the Kuomintang.
 Huang Min-hui (1959), former mayor of Chiayi City, vice chairperson of Kuomintang, a member of the Legislative Yuan (1999 and 2005).
 Lo Chen-Jung (1961), Taiwanese left-handed baseball pitcher.
 Wu Bai (1968), Taiwanese rock singer.

International relations

Twin towns — sister cities 
Chiayi is twinned with:

  East Orange, New Jersey, United States (1972)
  Jackson, Mississippi, United States (1972)
  Juneau, Alaska, United States (1977)
  Murray, Utah, United States (1977)
  Bulacan Province, Philippines (1980)
  Martinsburg, West Virginia, United States (1988)
  Syracuse, New York, United States (1995)
  Hsinchu City, Taiwan (2002)

Transportation

Rail
Chiayi City is served by Chiayi Station and Jiabei Station of the Taiwan Railways Administration. Chiayi Station is the starting point for the Alishan Forest Railway. The city is also accessible from THSR Chiayi Station in Chiayi County.

Bus
Chiayi Bus Rapid Transit connects Chiayi City to Chiayi HSR station in the neighboring  Taibao City. Chiayi City Bus serves the urban areas of Chiayi City.

Air
Chiayi City is served by Chiayi Airport in the neighboring Shuishang Township.

In popular culture
Chiayi City and its street foods, including the famous Chiayi turkey rice, were featured on the Netflix TV series, Street Food, in season 1.

See also 
 List of mayors of Chiayi
 Chiayi County

References

External links 

 
 Chiayi City/County tourism official website
 Chiayi City Police Bureau official website
 
 
 National Chung Cheng University official website

 
1982 establishments in Taiwan
Provincial cities of Taiwan